Carrie Daniels may refer to:

 Carrie Savage (born 1980), or Carrie Daniels, American theatre, film, and TV actress, who is mostly known for her work as a voice actress
 Carrie Daniels (basketball), American college basketball coach